Moshe Aharon "Moshik" Roth is an Israeli celebrity chef. He was head chef of restaurant &Moshik in Amsterdam, the Netherlands, which held two Michelin stars.

Biography
Born in 1972 in Haifa, Israel; to a family of Ashkenazi Jewish descent, Russian-Jewish father and a Romanian-Jewish mother, Roth was raised in Eilat and afterwards in Yavne. After completing his military service in the IDF, he went to Eilat, intending to learn hotel management and met his future wife Els. When he was 23, Els went back to her homeland in the Netherlands and Roth followed her there. His first job was as pizzeria manager. After a while he studied in Jonnie Boer's restaurant - De Librije, from there he continued to apprentice in the Zwethheul restaurant, near Rotterdam and afterwards he opened his own restaurant 't Brouwerskolkje, where he was the chef, and his wife was the sommelier. The restaurant was located in a house which once was a pancake store.

't Brouwerskolkje restaurant got its first Michelin star in 2006 and the second in 2009. Roth closed the restaurant on April 14, 2012.

On August 15, 2012 he opened &samhoud places in Amsterdam together with entrepreneur Salem Samhoud. The restaurant received two Michelin stars in November 2012. He renamed this restaurant to &moshik in January 2018.

Roth used to go frequently to Alsace, to work together with chef , chef and owner of restaurant L'Arnsbourg in Alsace, France, and some of the dishes in both restaurants are similar. The preparation of the food combined classical and Molecular gastronomy techniques.

Roth participated as one of the three judges of the Israeli reality show Game of Chefs.

In 2022, he was a judge on the first Israeli season of the The Next Restaurant.

References

External links
 Restaurant site
 t_Brouwerskolkje in  michelin guide
  Gabi Bar-Haim (November 30, 2005), The First Israeli with michelin star, Maariv (newspaper) (Hebrew)
 (May 23, 2011), Molecular star - Chef Moshik Roth in Israel Nana 10 (Hebrew)
 Adi Avisar, Gastronomic experience in Catit, Wine, Gourmet and Alcohol Magazine issue 137 (Hebrew)
 Sheri Ansky (October 3, 2009), Roasted chicken Science: How to make roasted chicken with perfect Taste Maariv (Hebrew)

Israeli television chefs
Israeli Ashkenazi Jews
Dutch chefs
Dutch Ashkenazi Jews
Living people
Head chefs of Michelin starred restaurants
Israeli people of Romanian-Jewish descent
Israeli people of Russian-Jewish descent
People from Haifa
People from Eilat
1971 births